Punicacortein B is an ellagitannin, a polyphenol compound. It is found in the bark of Punica granatum (pomegranate).

References 

Pomegranate ellagitannins
Heterocyclic compounds with 4 rings